James Charles Wall (AKA J. Charles Wall, J. C. Wall) (1860–1943) was a British ecclesiologist, historian, and Fellow of the Royal Historical Society in the late 19th and early 20th century. He wrote many books, mainly on Church history, and was an early contributor to the Victoria History of the Counties of England project. He was born in Shoreditch on 15 July 1860 to James Wall and Mary Wall née Williams. He attended Westminster School and New College, Oxford.

Bibliography 
 The Tombs of the Kings of England, Sampson Low, Marston & Company, London, (1891)
 Alfred the Great: His Abbeys of Hyde, Athelney and Shaftesbury, (1900)
 Devils—Their Origins and History, Willian Brendon and Sons, Plymouth, (1904)
 Shrines Of British Saints, (1905)
 Shrines of the English Saints, (1905)
 An Old English Parish, (1907)
 Ancient Earthworks, (1908)
 Relics Of The Passion, (1910)
 Porches and Fonts. Wells Gardner, Darton and Co.. London (1912)
 The Church Chests of Essex, (1913, co-authored with H. W. Lewer)
 Medieval Wall Paintings, (1914)
 The First Christians of Britain, (1920)
 Pilgrimage, (1925)
 The Devil in Art

External links
 

Ecclesiologists
Fellows of the Royal Historical Society
Wall family
People educated at Westminster School, London
1860 births
1943 deaths
People from Shoreditch